Emirates Club is a professional football club based in the city of Ras Al Khaimah, United Arab Emirates. They play in the UAE Pro League after being promoted from the UAE First Division League. They play their home games at the Emirates Club Stadium.

History

Establishment
The club was established in 1969, from a merger of three local football teams: Al Ittihad, Al Ahly and Al Shaab under the name Oman Club. They were one of the first three teams along with Al Ahli and Al Oruba to play in the UAE league, however they would finish at last place with only 1 point.

In October 1982 the club name was changed to Al Qadsia, Two years later in July 1984 Al Qadsia was merged with Al Taliya and Al Nassr and became the club known today as Emirates Cultural Sport Club.

On 29 May 2011, Sheikh Ahmed bin Saqr al-Qassimi, Sheikh Mohammed bin Kayed Al Qasimi, Chairman of Emirates and Ras Al Khaimah Clubs, announced the merger of the two clubs in one club under the name Emirates Club, To be representative of the Emirate of Ras Al Khaimah. Decision to merge came on the recommendation of Sheikh Saud bin Saqr al Qasimi, Ruler of Ras Al Khaimah. On 11 June 2011, the new composition of the club was announced.

Honors
UAE Division One: 6
 1977–78, 1983–84, 1996–97, 2002–03, 2012–13, 2019–20
UAE President Cup: 1
 2009–10
UAE Super Cup: 1
2010

Current squad
As of UAE First Division League:

Unregistered players

{|
|-
| valign="top" |

Out on loan

Staff

Board Members

Former managers
 Zoran Đorđević (1981–82)
 Akram Ahmad Salman (1996–97)
 Reinhard Fabisch (2005–07)
 Ebrahim Ghasempour (1 January 2009 – 10 September 2009)
 Ahmed Al-A'ajlani (2009–10)
 Ghazi Ghrairi (2010–11)
 Khaled Al Suwaidi (13 December 2011 – 31 December 2011)
 Lotfi Benzarti (1 January 2012 – 8 October 2012)
 Júnior dos Santos (2012–13)
 Sérgio Alexandre (2013)
 Eid Barout (30 May 2013 – 8 December 2013)
 Paulo Comelli (9 December 2013 – June 2016)
Theo Bücker (June 2016 – December 2016)
 Noureddine Abidi (caretaker) (December 2016)
 Ivan Hašek (28 December 2016 – 31 October 2017 )
 Noureddine Abidi (caretaker) (1 November 2017 – 5 January 2018)
 Nour Al Obaidi (5 January 2018 – 20 April 2018 )
 Nizar Mahrous (20 April 2018  – 28 May 2018)
 Jalal Qaderi (28 May 2018 –8 June 2019)
 Eid Barout (9 June 2019 –31 October 2019)
 Gjoko Hadžievski (3 November 2019 –30 June 2021)
 Tarik Sektioui (18 August 2021 –26 December 2021)
 Ayman El Ramady (27 December 2021 – 1 June 2022)
 Fathi Al-Obeidi (1 July 2022 –22 February 2023)
 Mohammed Al Jalboot (23 February 2023 –present)

Pro-League record

Notes 2019–20 UAE football season was cancelled due to the COVID-19 pandemic in the United Arab Emirates.

Key
 Pos. = Position
 Tms. = Number of teams
 Lvl. = League

References

External links
 Official Website

 
Emirates
1969 establishments in the Trucial States
Association football clubs established in 1969
Football clubs in the Emirate of Ras Al Khaimah